Terrence Anthony Boyd (born February 16, 1991) is a professional soccer player who plays as a forward for 2. Liga club 1. FC Kaiserslautern. Born in Germany, he represented the United States national team.

Early life
Boyd is the son of an African American serviceman and his German wife. The family returned to the U.S. shortly after his birth, settling in Queens, New York. However, his parents soon divorced, and his mother returned to Germany along with Terrence. His father was soon out of his life, and his mother eventually remarried. Boyd credits his stepfather for much of his success, saying in a 2012 interview,I don't think I would have become a pro without him because I am a lazy guy... He was really strict, but he helped me to stay out of the trouble and all the s*** that could do some problems for you. I'm a guy who is trying to get better every day, and that focus, I got it from him.

Club career

Early career
Boyd grew up playing in various youth systems but made his senior debut with Hertha BSC II in 2009. After a couple of seasons primarily on the bench, where he made eight appearances and four appearances, he found a role in the starting lineup and ended his final season with 13 goals. After his contract with Hertha expired, he signed with Borussia Dortmund in the Bundesliga and debuted with their reserve squad Borussia Dortmund II. On October 22, 2011 Boyd received his first call-up to the Borussia Dortmund first team in their Bundesliga match against 1. FC Köln. Although he dressed as part of the 18-man squad, Boyd did not play in Dortmund's 5–0 win over 1. FC Köln. He did not make any appearances for the first team and scored 20 goals in 32 appearances for the reserve team.

Rapid Wien
In June 2012, Boyd signed a three–year deal with Austrian club Rapid Wien. On July 21, making his professional first team debut, Boyd scored his first and second league goals and added an assist against Wacker Innsbruck; Boyd was named the Man of the Match.  The youngster was impressive for Rapid during his inaugural season in the Austrian Bundesliga, second on the team in scoring with 13 goals as the club finished in third place and securing a place in the third qualifying round of the 2013–14 UEFA Europa League. Boyd scored 37 goals in 80 appearances for Rapid.

RB Leipzig
In July 2014, Boyd was sold to RB Leipzig. On October 17, 2014, he made his debut in RB Leipzig's 1–0 loss to Nürnberg. He suffered a torn ACL in December 2014, missing the remainder of the season. Boyd finished the 2014–15 season with three goals in eight appearances. He did not make any appearances during the 2015–16 and 2016–17 seasons. However, he scored five goals in nine appearances for the reserve team.

Darmstadt 98
After getting no playing time for Leipzig's senior team in the first half of the 2016–17 season, Boyd moved to SV Darmstadt 98 in January 2017. During the 2017–18 season, he scored four goals in 24 appearances.

Toronto FC
In February 2019, Boyd signed for Toronto FC.

Hallescher FC
In July 2019, Boyd returned to Germany, signing for 3. Liga side Hallescher FC. He scored seven goals and made one assist in 17 league appearances in the 2021–22 season. Overall, he amassed 39 goals in 86 appearances.

1. FC Kaiserslautern
Boyd moved to a new 3. Liga team 1. FC Kaiserslautern in January 2022 and is currently their top scorer with 9 goals in 13 games for the German soccer club.

International career
Born to an African American serviceman and a German mother, Boyd holds dual citizenship. His path to the U.S. national team began when his Hertha youth teammate Bryan Arguez, then a United States U-20 international, told then U-20 Head Coach Thomas Rongen that there were several Americans on Hertha's books that Rongen needed to recruit. Rongen soon invited him to a U-20 training camp, but Boyd did not yet have a U.S. passport. For Boyd, the process of obtaining a passport forced him to deal with the pain of his family's breakup, as he needed his biological father to sign the necessary paperwork. He eventually connected with other relatives on Facebook and used his paternal aunt as a go-between to get his papers signed.

With his passport in hand, Boyd made several appearances for the United States U-20 team. Boyd was called into the U-23 camp in Europe in November 2011. Boyd also participated in the December 2011 U-23 camp in Florida. Boyd was initially called into the U-23 pre-Olympic Qualifying camp and was set to join the team for its February 29, 2012 match against Mexico's U-23 team. However, he instead made his debut with the full U.S. national team in its February 29 victory over Italy, coming on in the second half.

Boyd was called to the U-23 Olympic Qualifying squad in March 2012. He scored two goals in the U-23 team's must-win game against El Salvador, but a late goal conceded sent the team out of the tournament in the group stage.

On May 20, Boyd was announced as one of the final additions to the U.S. squad for a five-game series set to culminate in two 2014 FIFA World Cup qualification matches. On May 26, he earned his first start ever for the United States in a 5-1 win against Scotland. He cemented his status as an American in international soccer by playing in the FIFA World Cup qualifier on June 8, 2012 against Antigua and Barbuda.

Later in 2012, Boyd played a major role in a landmark result for the U.S. in a friendly match against Mexico at the Estadio Azteca. His back heel allowed Michael Orozco Fiscal to score the only goal of the match, the United States' first ever victory at the stadium.

Boyd was included on Jürgen Klinsmann's 30-man preliminary roster for the 2014 FIFA World Cup; however, he did not make the final 23-man roster for Brazil.

Boyd has affirmed his commitment to the USMNT by getting a tattoo of the American flag on his arm.

Career statistics

Club

International

References

External links

1991 births
Living people
Footballers from Bremen
German people of American descent
Sportspeople of American descent
Citizens of the United States through descent
German people of African-American descent
American people of German descent
Association football forwards
German footballers
African-American soccer players
American soccer players
United States men's international soccer players
United States men's under-20 international soccer players
United States men's under-23 international soccer players
Hertha BSC II players
Borussia Dortmund II players
SK Rapid Wien players
RB Leipzig players
SV Darmstadt 98 players
Toronto FC players
Hallescher FC players
1. FC Kaiserslautern players
Austrian Football Bundesliga players
Bundesliga players
2. Bundesliga players
3. Liga players
Regionalliga players
Major League Soccer players
American expatriate soccer players
German expatriate footballers
Expatriate footballers in Austria
American expatriate sportspeople in Austria
German expatriate sportspeople in Austria
Expatriate soccer players in Canada
American expatriate sportspeople in Canada
German expatriate sportspeople in Canada